The women's 400 metre individual medley event at the 2018 Commonwealth Games was held on 5 April at the Gold Coast Aquatic Centre.

Records
Prior to this competition, the existing world, Commonwealth and Games records were as follows:

Schedule
The schedule is as follows:

All times are Australian Eastern Standard Time (UTC+10)

Results

Heats

Final

References

Women's 0400 metre individual medley
Commonwealth Games
Common